In combinatorial mathematics, an independence system  is a pair , where  is a finite set and  is a collection of subsets of  (called the independent sets or feasible sets) with the following properties:
 The empty set is independent, i.e., .
 Every subset of an independent set is independent, i.e., for each , we have .  This is sometimes called the hereditary property, or downward-closedness.
Another term for an independence system is an abstract simplicial complex.

Relation to other concepts 
When using this terminology, the elements in the set  are called vertices and elements in the family  are called hyperedges. So an independence system can be defined shortly as a downward-closed hypergraph.
 An independence system with an additional property called the augmentation property or the independent set exchange property yields a matroid. The following expression summarizes the relations between the terms:HYPERGRAPHS  INDEPENDENCE-SYSTEMS  ABSTRACT-SIMPLICIAL-COMPLEXES  MATROIDS.

References
.

Combinatorics
Hypergraphs